The 9mm police revolver (9mm警用轉輪手槍) is a revolver produced in the People's Republic of China. It is also identified as ZLS05, Type 05 and Norinco NP-216.

Design 
The 9mm police revolver was designed for law enforcement use. The overall size of the gun is 197 mm × 35.6 mm × 125 mm, the barrel length is 76.2 mm, the aiming baseline is 108 mm, and the whole gun weighs 840 grams. The ammunition capacity is 6 rounds and the service life exceeds 3,000 rounds. The initial velocity is about 300 meters per second, and the effective range is 50 meters. There are two launch methods, single-action and double-action.

It has a polished surfaced, achieved via special surface treatment process.

The gun can fire 9mm DAP92 pistol ammunition, 9×19mm Parabellum ammunition and China-made 9mm low penetration killing pistol ammunition, and it can also fire sound ammunition for alarm and warning to suspects. It can also be loaded with various riot control ammunition, such as low penetration type, barrier type, dispersive type, non-lethal type, etc., to deal with various emergencies.

Overview 
In 2005, the design and finalization of the 9mm police revolver was completed, and the development and procedures were carried out in strict accordance with the PLA standards and requirements. According to an engineer from the 208 Institute, in July 2005, the Ministry of Public Security issued 5 to 10 new revolver for trial use to public security bureaus in 10 cities including Chengdu, Zhengzhou, Lanzhou, Hangzhou, and Dongguan.

In November, after the trial reports from various regions were fed back to the Ministry of Public Security, the new gun was finalized. At the same time, the 9mm police revolver began to be distributed to the public security bodies, becoming one of the standard pistols of the public security bodies.

In 2014, the NRP9 Police Revolver was introduced, with various improvements over the 2005/06 version.

Users
 : People's Armed Police and People's Police of the People's Republic of China

References
 https://war.163.com/14/0430/10/9R2SC4AH00014J0G.html
 https://m.sohu.com/n/503180552/?wscrid=95360_6
 http://modernfirearms.net/handguns/double-action-revolvers/ch/police-revolver-e.html
 http://www.wargamecn.com/home.php?mod=space&uid=75762&do=blog&id=29469
 http://www.sadefensejournal.com/wp/?p=2874

External links
 https://huoqibaike.club/wiki/ZLS05%E5%BC%8F%E8%AD%A6%E7%94%A8%E8%BD%AC%E8%BD%AE%E6%89%8B%E6%9E%AA
 https://huoqibaike.club/wiki/NRP9%E5%9E%8B%E8%BD%AC%E8%BD%AE%E6%89%8B%E6%9E%AA

Double-action revolvers
9mm Parabellum revolvers
Firearms of the People's Republic of China
Norinco